The Treaty of St. Mary's may refer to one of six treaties concluded in fall of 1818 between the United States and Natives of central Indiana regarding purchase of Native land. The treaties were

Treaty with the Wyandot, etc.
Treaty with the Wyandot
Treaty with the Potawatomi
Treaty with the Wea
Treaty with the Delaware
Treaty with the Miami

The main treaty was with the Miamis, who were the main tribe in Indiana. Unqualified references to the treaty usually refer to this one. The treaties acquired a substantial portion of the land area (dubbed the New Purchase) of the state of Indiana from the Miami, Delaware, Potawatomi, and others in exchange for cash, salt, sawmills, and other goods, effectively moving the northern boundary of the state from near the Ohio River to the Wabash River in the northwest and north. They also resulted in creation of Indian reservations and continued the process of Indian removals in Indiana begun by the Treaty of Greenville in 1795.

The treaties
In the fall of 1818 six separate treaties were completed at St. Marys, Ohio, between the United States and the Wyandot, Seneca, Shawnese, and Ottawas (September 17), with the Wyandot (September 20), the Potawatomi (October 2), the Wea (October 2), the Delaware (October 3), and the Miami (October 6).

The Treaty with the Wyandot of September 20, 1818, resulted in the cession by the Natives of two small tracts of land in Wayne County, Michigan Territory, containing the villages of Maguaga and Brownstown in present-day Riverview and Flat Rock, Michigan. In return, Territorial Governor Lewis Cass granted them land in Huron Charter Township, Michigan.
 
The treaty with the Wea of October 2 resulted in the Wea ceding their claims to all lands in Ohio, Indiana, and Illinois.

The treaty with the Miami was signed on October 6, 1818, at St. Mary's, Ohio, between representatives of the United States and the Miami tribe and others living in their territory. Jonathan Jennings, Lewis Cass, and Benjamin Parke, acting as representatives of the United States, signed the treaty. The accord contained seven articles. Based on the terms of the accord, the Miami ceded territories south of the Wabash River covering a large portion of central Indiana, subsequently known as the "New Purchase", to the United States. This tract consisted of the entire central portion of Indiana between the Wabash River and the old boundary established by the Treaty of Fort Wayne (1809). It also established the first Indian reservation in Indiana, the Great Miami Reserve in the northern portion of the New Purchase. In another tenet of the accord, the United States agreed to pay the Miami a perpetual annuity of fifteen thousand dollars. Moreover, the United States agreed to construct one gristmill and one sawmill, as well as provide one blacksmith, one gunsmith, and agricultural implements. The Miami would also be provided one hundred and sixty bushels of salt annually.

New Purchase tract

The New Purchase was a jagged shaped area comprising most of the central third of the state. It had a large trapezoid "bite" out of the northern boundary that became the Great Miami Reserve, and a sawtooth in the northwest where the Tippecanoe and Wabash Rivers formed a gore. The treaties defined the northern and western boundary as the Wabash, Tippecanoe, and Vermillion rivers; the southwestern and southeastern boundaries were the treaty lines from the Treaty of Fort Wayne of 1809; the far southeastern and northeastern boundaries were treaty lines from the Treaty of Grouseland of 1805, and parts of the eastern and western boundaries were the borders of the state. The southern tip of the area extended to what is today central Jackson County near Brownstown.

Big Miami Reserve
By the treaty with the Miami, the Miami ceded most of their land south of the Wabash River, except for some individual plots and a parcel in north central Indiana between the Eel River and the Salamonie River called the Big Miami Reserve. It encompassed all of present-day Howard County, and portions of seven surrounding counties: Wabash, Miami, Cass, Clinton, Tipton, Madison, and Grant. At its creation, the area was wilderness, and there were no colonial settlements between Terre Haute and Fort Wayne on the Wabash River.

The reservation was short-lived. By 1840, via several additional treaties, the state effectively acquired the reservation and removed the Indians to west of the Mississippi River.

Aftermath
The treaties resulted in the confinement of the Miami to the reserve area and the removal of the Delaware, who dominated central and east central Indiana, to west of the Mississippi River by 1820, clearing the way for colonization by settlers migrating north and west from Cincinnati and other Ohio River settlements.

The area was called the Delaware New Purchase until it was divided into Wabash County in the northwest and Delaware County in the southeast on January 2, 1820. Those counties were soon after dissolved, and the areas came to be called the "Wabash New Purchase" and "Delaware New Purchase" (renamed the "Adams New Purchase" in 1827). Subsequently, 35 new counties were carved out of the original area. The future state capital of Indianapolis was founded in 1822, roughly in the center of the New Purchase area.

See also
Treaty of Fort Meigs, the immediate precursor
List of Indian treaties
Indian Removals in Ohio
Indian removals in Indiana

References

External links
Indian Affairs: Laws and Treaties - Treaty with the Miami, 1818
Miami Treaty of St. Mary's. ISL Digital Collections. Indiana State Library.
"Treaty of St. Mary's." Indiana State Library Blog, August 24, 2015

1818 treaties
1818 in the United States
September 1818 events
October 1818 events
Miami tribe
Native American history of Indiana
St. Mary